West Lynn is a hamlet in the civil parish of Lynton and Lynmouth in the North Devon district of Devon, England. The hamlet is situated in the Exmoor National Park.

 

Hamlets in Devon